Dave D. Taylor is an American game programmer, best known as a former id Software employee and noted for his work promoting Linux gaming.

Early life
He graduated from the University of Texas at Austin with a Bachelor of Science degree in electrical engineering in 1993.

id Software
Taylor worked for id Software between 1993 and 1996, and was during the time involved with the development of Doom and Quake. He created ports of both games to IRIX, AIX, Solaris and Linux, and helped program the Atari Jaguar ports of Doom and Wolfenstein 3D. He also considers himself to have been the "spackle coder" on Doom, for adding things such as the status bar, sound library integration, the automap, level transitions, cheat codes, and the network chat system. On Quake, he wrote the original sound engine, the DOS TCP/IP network library, and added VESA 2.0 support. One of the musical themes in Doom II, "The Dave D. Taylor Blues", was named after him by Robert Prince.

The 2003 book Masters of Doom: How Two Guys Created an Empire and Transformed Pop Culture mentions his habit of passing out from motion sickness after prolonged playing of Doom, and how the other employees would, after such incidents, sketch a body outline of his unconscious form with masking tape. After the success of the game, they bought him a couch to pass out on. His attempts to "talk up" Quake on-line, his purchase of an Acura NSX with Doom money, his friendship with American McGee, and his eventual departure from the company are also mentioned.

After id
Taylor founded a small game company called Crack dot Com from 1996 to 1998. Crack dot Com released only one game, Abuse, a PC platform shooter. In a 1997 interview, he claimed that he wasn't particularly proud of Abuse, and that "he set out to prove that a person could sell 50,000 copies of a so-so game." He then led the effort to build Golgotha, a first-person shooter / real-time strategy hybrid, but the company folded before its completion.

Between 1998 and 2001 he worked for Transmeta. He was president of Carbon6 from 2001 to 2002, there also working as lead designer and producer for the Game Boy Advance game Spy Kids Challenger. Since 2002 he has been vice president of Naked Sky Entertainment and since 2003 also an advisor and freelance game designer. He is also willing to act as a Linux game porter for pay projects.

In 2009, he produced Abuse Classic for the Apple iPhone and Beakiez for the PC.

References

External links
 Dave Taylor's Official Website
 Interview with Dave Taylor by James Hills (June 19, 1999)
 Dave D. Taylor interview about Crack.Com from LinuxGames (2003)
 Beakiez, a game by Taylor

American computer programmers
Cockrell School of Engineering alumni
Linux game porters
Linux people
Living people
Video game programmers
Place of birth missing (living people)
Year of birth missing (living people)